Cañitas de Felipe Pescador is one of the 58 municipalities in the state of Zacatecas, Mexico. It is located in the northern part of Zacatecas and is bounded by the municipalities of Río Grande, Villa de Cos, and Fresnillo.

The municipal seat is also called Cañitas de Felipe Pescador.

History
The first inhabitants of the Cañitas de Felipe Pescador region were the Huichol. In 1918, the region became populated with farmers. In 1921, governor Donato Moreno granted a motion to legally fund the Cañitas region with the expropriation of haciendas as an ejido, a system of communal land. This led to the rise of the region to become an Independent Congregation of the Municipality of Fresnillo.

In 1921, the first school was founded with the name of Carlos A. Carrillo, which placed special attention to environmental education. That same year the train station was installed in the city of Cañitas, and the community of La Colorada was moved to the region.

It was not until November 19, 1958, that Cañitas went from being a Congregation to a Municipality. Gilberto Montes Monsiváis was named Municipal president, and that same year elections are held in which Herón Domínguez was declared the winner, and he became the first elected municipal president of Cañitas de Felipe Pescador (1959–1961).

Population
In the 2005 census, Cañitas de Felipe Pescador reported a population of 7,893. Of these, 5,950 lived in the municipal seat, and the remainder lived in surrounding rural communities.

Religion
Most of the population (93.83%) is Catholic; Protestants and Evangelicals follow with 2.87%, and the remainder are Seventh-day Adventists and Neo-Pentecostals with 6.17%.

Towns and Villages
Cañitas de Felipe Pescador
Boquilla de Abajo
Los Caballos
Cañitas Viejo (Cañitas Viejas)
La Quemada
San Francisco
El Saucillo
El Porvenir
Potrero de Badillo (Badillo)
Enrique Estrada

References

Municipalities of Zacatecas